2056 Nancy, provisional designation , is a stony background asteroid from the inner regions of the asteroid belt, approximately  in diameter. It was discovered on 15 October 1909, by German astronomer Joseph Helffrich at Heidelberg Observatory in southwest Germany. The S-type asteroid has a tentative rotation period of 15.0 hours. It was named for Nancy Marsden, wife of British astronomer Brian G. Marsden.

Orbit and classification 

Nancy is a non-family asteroid of the main belt's background population. It orbits the Sun in the inner asteroid belt at a distance of 1.9–2.5 AU once every 3 years and 4 months (1,206 days; semi-major axis of 2.22 AU). Its orbit has an eccentricity of 0.14 and an inclination of 4° with respect to the ecliptic. The asteroid's observation arc begins with its official discovery observation at Heidelberg in October 1909.

Naming 

This minor planet was named after Nancy Lou Zissell Marsden, wife of British astronomer Brian G. Marsden, who established the asteroid's identification, and after whom another minor planet, 1877 Marsden, was previously named. The official  was published by the Minor Planet Center on 1 April 1978.

Physical characteristics 

Nancy is a common S-type asteroid in the SMASS classification.

Lightcurves 

As of 2018, only a single fragmentary lightcurve of Nancy has been obtained from photometric observation. Analysis of the rotational lightcurve gives a period of 15 hours with a brightness variation of 0.08 magnitude.

Diameter and albedo 

According to the survey carried out by the NEOWISE mission of NASA's Wide-field Infrared Survey Explorer, Nancy measures between 7.783 and 11.19 kilometers in diameter and its surface has an albedo between 0.16 and 0.351. The Collaborative Asteroid Lightcurve Link assumes a standard albedo for stony asteroids of 0.20 and calculates a diameter of 10.30 kilometers based on an absolute magnitude of 12.3.

Notes

References

External links 
 Asteroid Lightcurve Database (LCDB), query form (info )
 Dictionary of Minor Planet Names, Google books
 Discovery Circumstances: Numbered Minor Planets (1)-(5000) – Minor Planet Center
 
 

002056
Discoveries by Joseph Helffrich
Named minor planets
002056
19091015